The Swinging Star is the fifth studio album by the Japanese band Dreams Come True, released in 1992. It reached number one on the Oricon Albums Chart, stayed on the chart for 55 weeks, and was also once the biggest-selling Japanese-language album of all time. As of January 2015, it has sold over 3 million copies in Japan and has been certified three-times million by the Recording Industry Association of Japan (RIAJ). The track "Sweet Sweet Sweet" originated as the ending theme of the video game Sonic the Hedgehog 2, for which Masato Nakamura composed the music, and would later be remixed by American rapper and producer Akon for Sonic the Hedgehog in 2006.

Track list

Charts and certifications

Charts

Certifications

References

1992 albums
Dreams Come True (band) albums